The Ferry Man Manjusaka is a 2018 Chinese fantasy romance film starring He Hua, Richards Wang, Yu Yi, Yue Lina Meng, Ni Hongjie, Ju Xingmao, Zhao Hengxuan and Lu Jiani. The film was released on iQiyi on 1 February 2018 and has already accumulated 42 million RMB in shared revenue, with a revenue size and popularity comparable with films shown at the same time in traditional cinemas.

Cast
He Hua as San Qi
Richards Wang as Chang Sheng
Yue Lina as Meng Qi, Old Lady Meng
Yu Yi as Zhao Li 
Ni Hongjie as Sun Shangxiang, Ghost Guard
Ju Xingmao as Wang Xiaolu, Ghost
Zhao Hengxuan as Qi Yang
Lu Jiani as Hua Ningxue

References

2018 films
Films based on Asian myths and legends
Films based on Chinese novels
2010s Mandarin-language films